"Knock Yourself Out" is a 2001 song by Jadakiss.

Knock Yourself Out may also refer to:

 "Knock Yourself Out", a 1987 episode of Full House
 "Knock Yourself Out", a song by Michelle Branch from the album Hopeless Romantic, 2017

See also 
 Knockout (disambiguation)